Taishō Democracy was a liberal and democratic trend across the political, economic, and cultural fields in Japan that began roughly after the Russo-Japanese War and continued until the end of the Taishō era (19121926). The term "Taishō Democracy" has been widely used since the book "" written by Shinobu Seizaburō.

Summary

Establishment 
Although there are many theories about when Taishō Democracy began and ended, 1905 is often said to be the starting year of the Democratic era. 1905 was the year when Bloody Sunday happened in Russia, which subsequently led to the Russian Revolution. Bloody Sunday was instigated by loss of faith in the Tsarist government as a result of public discontent with the results of the Russo-Japanese War. In other words, the combination of the burden on the workers and general populace and the remote and costly war against Japan contributed greatly to the public unrest which sparked the 1905 revolution. Meanwhile, a similar combination existed in Japan. During the war and even before the war, Japanese socialists stated that the war would need sacrifice from the people. Heimin Shinbun pointed out on 14 February 1904 that "The people will suffer for a long time from taxation for the war.". Some Christians and women's liberationists expressed similar anti-war attitudes.

The Russo-Japanese war ended in 1905, and the peace treaty was signed. Although Japan won, the general populace was disappointed by the result of the peace treaty. The Japanese people saw the peace treaty, which lacked major Russian territorial cessions and monetary reparations, as foreshadowing more sacrifice without benefits. Public anger toward the government gradually grew, and eventually led to the foundation of the movement against the Russo-Japanese war peace treaty.

Key Events 
There are many theories about the timing of the Taishō Democracy, but many historians agree that the following events are crucial to Taishō Democracy.

First of all, there was the Russo-Japanese War peace treaty protest movement and the Hibiya incendiary incident that accompanied it. The movement grew across the country and gradually exposed the people's dissatisfaction with their government. This was the first instance of a popular movement trying to replace the cabinet in Japanese history, and the Katsura cabinet collapsed only 53 days after its formation.  and the establishment of the Hara Cabinet are considered to be a major milestone in Taisho democracy. In 1932, and  launched a campaign to overthrow Kiyoura Keigo's cabinet.

Background

Minpon Shugi 
Minpon Shugi is one form of democracy based on monarchical sovereignty that the political scientist Yoshino Sakuzo put forward in "". According to this thesis, Minpon Shugi has two main points. First, it is "the policy in exercising political power of valuing the profit, happiness, and opinions of the people." Second, it demands that "in the final determination of policies, the people's opinions must be valued highly." In short, Minpon Shugi does not fully specify where sovereignty lies, and it can coexist with the monarchical system.

At that time, people criticized Minshu Shugi, the concept of democracy based on popular sovereignty, because people were afraid of Minshu Shugi violating their monarchical system. Yoshino tried to change the concept of democracy based on people's sovereignty (Minshu Shugi), to a concept of democracy based on monarchical sovereignty (Minpon Shugi), in order to fit "democracy" into Japanese society.

After WWI, Minpon Shugi became the ideology of the Taishō Democracy Movement. The Taishō Democracy Movement was led by activists who were inspired by the Minpon Shugi that Yoshino advocated.

National discontent during the war 
The Russo-Japanese War caused serious damage to Japan's finances. Japan used foreign debt to start the war. It is said that the reason why Japan barely won was that the Russian government held back its main force for fear of revolution. Japanese soldiers were plagued by Russian machine guns and even some who survived were covered all over with wounds. The peace treaty offered by U.S. President Roosevelt achieved "more than expected," said a government-leaning newspaper at the time.

On the other hand, the public reaction was the exact opposite. The people had sacrificed a great deal for the Russo-Japanese War. The government had imposed higher taxes on the citizens to pay for the war, and the peasants had had to pay most of their profits in taxes. The tax also dealt a blow to small and medium-sized businesses, and even during the war, the nation's silk cloth manufacturers' associations, wholesale brokers, union representatives, and the retail trade association came to Tokyo to oppose it. The same kind of opposition arose towards the salt monopoly. Thus, dissatisfaction with the war grew from rural areas across the country to urban areas.

Effects of Taishō Democracy 
The nation's trend towards universal democracy and independence can be seen as products of Taishō Democracy. These effects can be seen in various fields in that era, for example:

Politics 
People started to express more of their opinions about the nation's decisions. In other words, people began to think for themselves, beyond what they were told by national leadership, and tried to exert political power to express their opinions. Political movements such as launching party and the movement for universal suffrage are some examples.

Economy 
The tendency of independence of the capital occurred and people sought to be free from the regulations. In other words, people demanded a limited government. As a result, the power of capitalists or finance experts got stronger than before. Moreover, people began the movement of abolition of tax and claimed a disarmament.

Education 
Education for its own sake, independent of other concerns, was also advocated. University leadership and the press became independent of government, and people gained the ability to express their own opinions, independent from government views. Moreover, the increase in the literacy rate allowed people to read more books and get more information.

Women's Activists 
The social system of patriarchy still existed in Japan at that time; however, there had been a gradual change to the traditional position of women. Itō Noe, a feminist and editor of a magazine Seitō (Bluestocking), criticized that women were not being given the same rights as men. Itō Noe along with other women's activists such as Hiratsuka Raichō and Yoshiya Nobuko tried to make changes to the system of male privilege, and aimed for the independence of women.

See also 

  (平澤計七)
  (山本宣治)
 Takiji Kobayashi (小林多喜二)
 Hiratsuka Raichō (平塚らいてう)
 Itō Noe (伊藤野枝)
 Yoshiya Nobuko (吉屋信子)
 Woman's suffrage (女性参政権)
 Minpon Shugi (民本主義)
 Universal suffrage
 Freedom and People's Rights Movement (自由民権運動)
 Hanshinkan Modernism

References

External links 
 https://www.facinghistory.org/nanjing-atrocities/nation-building/taisho-democracy-japan-1912-1926
 https://www.japantimes.co.jp/life/2012/07/29/general/taisho-democracy-pays-the-ultimate-price/#.XulryUX7Ryw

Social history of Japan
Democracy movements
Taishō period
Russo-Japanese War
Politics of the Empire of Japan